Ludwig Böhmig (8 August 1858 – 5 January 1948) was an Austrian zoologist and platyhelminthologist born in Niederebersbach, Saxony.

Böhmig was a professor at the University of Graz, where he was a long-time collaborator of zoologist Ludwig von Graff (1851–1924). From 1920 to 1929 he was director of the zoological institute at Graz.

He specialized in anatomical and histological studies of Turbellaria and Nemertea, and is credited with providing taxonomic nomenclature for a number of flatworm/nemertine species. The species Convoluta bohmigi (Brauner, 1920) and Hypoblepharina boehmigi (Karling, 1973) are named after him.

Written works 
 Die Turbellaria acoela der Plankton-expedition,  1895
 Beitrage zur Anatomie und Histologie der Nemertinen (Contributions to the anatomy and histology of nemertines, 1898
 Turbellarien, 1908
 Die Zelle (morphologie und vermehrung), 1920.

References 
 Botanik und Zoologie in Österreich in den Jahren 1850 bis 1900 (biographical information)

Academic staff of the University of Graz
People from Meissen (district)
Austrian zoologists
1858 births
1948 deaths